The Jalaput Dam is a hydroelectric dam built on the Machkund River, a tributary of the Godavari River in India which rises in the Mudugal hills of Alluri Sitharama Raju district District and nearby Ondra Gadda it becomes the boundary between Andhra Pradesh and Odisha. This Dam is the most ignored one in India, currently, it is in dilapidated condition. For over 48 km the river runs nearly north along a meandering course through the Padwa Valley.  About 48 km south of Jeypore, it winds westward along the edge of the Plateau and then suddenly tums at a short angle to the south-west down a steep descent popularly known as Duduma Falls.

Jalaput Dam (and Reservoir) impounds 34.273 Tmcft of water for the needs of downstream 120 MW Machkund Hydro-Electric Scheme (MHES), which is in operation since 1955. The dam and the MHES are the joint projects of Andhra Pradesh and Odisha states. The existing six number power generation units have become old and obsolete compared to the latest technology. It is much economical to install a new hydro-electric scheme with a 15 km long tunnel using nearly 400 meters available level drop between Jalaput reservoir and the existing Balimela Reservoir backwaters. There is also the possibility to install a huge capacity Pumped-storage hydroelectricity station for the needs of peaking power using high water level drop. This reservoir will serve as the upper pond and the existing Balimela reservoir as the tail pond for installing Pumped-storage hydroelectricity units. Thus this reservoir water can be put to use more productively. The existing MHES can also be kept in operation by diverting the surplus water from the nearby upper Kolab reservoir into the Machkund river basin by joining with nearly 4 km long tunnel. This would facilitate to use of excess water from the upper Kolab reservoir for enhanced electricity generation in MHES and downstream Balimela powerhouse by using nearly 200% more available head in Sileru river basin before putting finally for irrigation use.

Origin 
Jalaput  derives its name from its local tribal dialect in which jala or jal means water (jal means water in Sanskrit as well). Put means residence or a storehouse or large place. The Jalaput water reservoir was the only water source for many of the local tribes in more than 100 tribal villages in and around Jalaput in the Koraput district the state of Odisha.  Before the present dam was built 55 years ago, it was a dense forest and a river surrounded by many tribal villages.

Jalaput  is a border village between Odisha and Andhra Pradesh. A bridge separate the two states and which both sides of it are known as LF (Andhra Pradesh, Visakhapatnam district) and RF (Odisha, Koraput district) respectively. Prior to the formation of the Jalaput Dam, it was known as Tentaput.

Jalaput , Machkund, and Onukadelli form the triangular shape of this hydroelectricity generation project. The electricity generated here is supplied to many nearby towns including Visakhapatnam, Vijaywada, both in Andhra Pradesh and, Koraput and Jeypore in Odisha.

Communication 
Jalaput is connected by road with major municipalities in Odisha and Andhra Pradesh. It is one of the most sought after tourist destinations in winter.  Araku Valley is 60 kilometres from here and Vishakhapatnam is the largest nearby major city.

Occupation 
Agriculture is the main occupation in nearby villages. The jalaputias (The residents of jalaput) are mainly Government employees.  The retail business here is dominated by prominent Odia speaking businessmen.  Woodcutting has become a prominent business here for a decade.  That rise to many gangs fights in the last few years.  District administration is worried about the rising fights amongst different groups for the last five years.  Apart from rice, java and many medicinal plants also form a significant part of agrarian business here.  Presently many have entered into contractual farming for medicinal plants, jatropha plantation, and tissue culture.

The village has 5-decade old temples, Uma Maheshwara Temple, mosques, and churches within a distance of 30 meters.  Residents celebrate all festivals without any religious overtones.  The village is the right combination of Telugu and Odissa language people.  People here understand and communicate in both languages with a mixed accent.
Every year May last week or JUNE the first-week people celebrate the local Village God festival and they celebrate it grandly; The local people call it "Aadavi talli jatara ".
The climate in this zone is very pleasant and a lot of attraction to viewers and mainly in the winter season the temperatures are even recorded 10 degrees below

Many aboriginal tribes inhabit nearby small villages.  Most of the region was densely covered by forest.  But recently due to massive deforestation in the last one and half-decade, much of the land has become barren.

The main village area residents are Government Employees and also a businessman.

See also

 Godavari Water Disputes Tribunal

References

External links 
 https://web.archive.org/web/20051024022506/http://www.ohpcltd.com/machkund/index.htm
 https://web.archive.org/web/20050817035831/http://www.orissawater.com/resovoir.htm
 https://web.archive.org/web/20080112103653/http://encarta.msn.com/map_701549159/Jalaput_Reservoir.html

Hydroelectric power stations in Odisha
Hydroelectric power stations in Andhra Pradesh
Dams in Andhra Pradesh
Dams completed in 1955
Inter-state disputes in India
Dams in Odisha
Dams on the Godavari River
Buildings and structures in Visakhapatnam district
1955 establishments in Madras State
20th-century architecture in India